The following are the members of the Dewan Undangan Negeri or state assemblies, elected in the 1990 state election and by-elections. Also included is the list of the Sarawak state assembly members who were elected in 1991.

Perlis

Kedah

Kelantan

Terengganu

Penang

Perak

Pahang

Selangor

Negeri Sembilan

Malacca

Johor

Sabah

1990–1994

Sarawak

1991–1996

Notes

References

Abdullah, Z. G., Adnan, H. N., & Lee, K. H. (1997). Malaysia, tokoh dulu dan kini = Malaysian personalities, past and present. Kuala Lumpur, Malaysia: Penerbit Universiti Malaya.
Anzagain Sdn. Bhd. (2004). Almanak keputusan pilihan raya umum: Parlimen & Dewan Undangan Negeri, 1959-1999. Shah Alam, Selangor: Anzagain. 
Chin, U.-H. (1996). Chinese politics in Sarawak: A study of the Sarawak United People's Party. Kuala Lumpur: Oxford University Press.
Faisal, S. H. (2012). Domination and Contestation: Muslim Bumiputera Politics in Sarawak. Institute of Southeast Asian Studies.
Ibnu, H. (1993). PAS kuasai Malaysia?: 1950-2000 sejarah kebangkitan dan masa depan. Kuala Lumpur: GG Edar.
Khong, K. H. (1991). Malaysia's General Election 1990: Continuity, Change, and Ethnic Politics. Institute of Southeast Asian Studies.
Zakry, A. (1990). Analisis pilihanraya umum, 1990. Kuala Lumpur: Penerbitan Myz.

1990 elections in Malaysia